Grupo Jumex, S.A. de C.V. (pronounced "HOO-MEX"), which means Jugos de Mexicali (Mexicali Juices), is a brand of juice and nectar from Mexico. The Jumex brand is also popular among Hispanic consumers in the United States. Currently, the Jumex Group (which manufactures Jumex) offers lines of fresh and preserved fruit juices, nectar, children's drinks, milk, smoothies, energy drinks, and sports drinks in Mexico.

Its headquarters are in Ecatepec de Morelos, State of Mexico, in the Mexico City area.

History
The origins of Jumex lie with Fruit and Juice Packing, Inc. (Empacadora de Frutas y Jugos, S.A.) and its Frugo brand, which was founded on April 27, 1961. Grupo Jumex began with the vision of Don Eugenio López Rodea, who managed to bottle the first apple nectar in a can of 350-milliliter on June 6, 1961. With the support of his family and community, Jumex was born with only 20 workers and now it has approximately 4000 workers. The first flavors were apricot, apple, guava, mango, pear, plum and tamarind; today several additional flavors and blends are offered under its brands. The actual Jumex brand and its "little blue can" was introduced in 1964. The current company associated with Jumex and other popular beverage brands is the Jumex Group, which consists of Frugosa, Botemex, Jugomex, Alijumex, Vilore Services Corp., Vilore Services, and Vilore Foods, Inc. (U.S.) Jumex is associated with the Mexican foods company La Costeña.

In 2013, Jumex acquired Kern's.

See also

Colección Jumex

References

External links
Jumex Group website
Jumex (archived)
Jumex Foundation

Food and drink companies established in 1961
Juice brands
Drink companies of Mexico
Mexican drinks
Mexican companies established in 1961